LTS Garðbær Studios (also known as LazyTown Entertainment) is a studio located in Garðabær, Iceland, which succeeded Lazy Shows (founded in 1992). The studio's productions included television series LazyTown. The studio was founded in 2002 by Magnús Scheving and his partners Guðmundur Þór Kárason, Raymond P. Le Gué and Ragnheiður Melsteð. In 2011, Turner Broadcasting System acquired LTS and in 2014 Turner moved the studio to the UK. As of 2019, the rights to the LazyTown brand are owned by Warner Bros. through its Warner Bros. International Television Nordics unit. LTS owns Wit Puppets and the creative studio from Le Gué Enterprises BV. As of 2022, the rights to the LazyTown brand are owned by Warner Bros. Discovery.

Productions

Lazy Shows
Áfram Latibær! (1996)
Glanni Glæpur Í Latibæ (1999)

Wit
Glanni Glæpur Í Latibæ (1999) 
Old Latibær commercials (Early 2000s)
LazyTown (2004-2014)
LazyTown Extra (2008)

Lazy Town Entertainment
LazyTown (2004-2014)
LazyTown Extra (2008)

LTS
Sprout's Super Sproutlet Show (2012)

Sources 

Film production companies of Iceland
Warner Bros. Discovery subsidiaries